Trevor Berghan (13 July 1914 – 23 September 1998) was a New Zealand rugby union player. A first five-eighth, Berghan represented Otago at a provincial level, and was a member of the New Zealand national side, the All Blacks, on their 1938 tour of Australia. He played six matches for the All Blacks on that tour, including three internationals.

Berghan studied at the University of Otago, graduating with a Bachelor of Dental Surgery in 1941. He was commissioned as a lieutenant in the New Zealand Dental Corps in June 1941, and later promoted to captain. He was seconded to the Royal New Zealand Navy with the rank of temporary surgeon lieutenant (D) in July 1943.

References

1914 births
1998 deaths
Rugby union players from the Northland Region
People educated at Rotorua Boys' High School
University of Otago alumni
New Zealand rugby union players
New Zealand international rugby union players
Otago rugby union players
Rugby union fly-halves
New Zealand dentists
Royal New Zealand Navy personnel of World War II
20th-century dentists